Hanso Schotanus á Steringa Idzerda (26 September 1885 – 2 November 1944) was a Dutch scientist, entrepreneur and pioneer in radio technology.

Between 1907 and 1917 he worked to introduce the already invented triode into radio technology. In 1919 Idzerda invented the triode IDZ-lamp, which was capable of transmitting and receiving radio messages containing the human voice. On 6 November 1919 he held the first public airing of a radio programme. His programme consisted of music, and him talking for a bit in between pieces. The PCGG transmitter he invented was capable of transmitting signals from The Hague all the way to England. Herman de Man, later to be an important author and radio maker, was present. From then on the programme aired every week. In 1922 the Daily Mail decided to sponsor Idzerda, who previously financed the operation with his own money and some donations. After the Daily Mail ceased its support Idzerda's company went bankrupt.

On 2 November 1944, a V-2 rocket that was being tested close to his house crashed, and Idzerda decided to take a look. He was ordered to leave the area but later snuck back to the rocket and was promptly executed.

References

1885 births
1944 deaths
20th-century Dutch scientists
20th-century Dutch inventors
History of radio